Michael Thurk (born 28 May 1976) is a German former professional footballer who played as a forward.

Career
Born in Frankfurt, Thurk joined 1. FSV Mainz 05 from Hessian Oberliga club SV Jügesheim in 1999 on advice of Django Mann who already connected a transfer of Abderrahim Ouakili.

In 2005–06, Thurk marked 12 goals, being the third best player who would be eligible to play for Germany. Before the 2006–07 season, he moved to Eintracht Frankfurt, a transfer that is much disputed among Eintracht supporters because Thurk was a long term player for local rivals Mainz and a cult figure at the 05ers. In January 2008, he moved to FC Augsburg. In the 2009–10 season, Augsburg finished just short of promotion to the Bundesliga with Thurk being the league's top goalscorer. The following season Augsburg won promotion, with Thurk being suspended from the club shortly before the beginning of the 2011–12 season. He signed for 1. FC Heidenheim in January 2012. He left Heidenheim at the end of the 2013–14 season as his contract was not renewed.

After departing Heidenheim, Thurk was close to agreeing moves to India and the United States, namely Columbus Crew, but no transfer went through due to his injury problems. A move to Gibraltarian club Europa also fell through in early 2015.

References

External links
 
 
 Michael Thurk at eintracht-archiv.de 

1976 births
Living people
Footballers from Frankfurt
German footballers
Association football forwards
Bundesliga players
2. Bundesliga players
3. Liga players
TGM SV Jügesheim players
1. FSV Mainz 05 players
FC Energie Cottbus players
Eintracht Frankfurt players
FC Augsburg players
1. FC Heidenheim players